Perezia is a genus of flowering plants in the family Asteraceae. It is distributed in South America, especially in the central and southern Andes.

Though some species occur at sea level, most Perezia grow in high-elevation mountain habitat. Species are found in most high Andean ecosystems, except for the páramo.

Some species are used in traditional medicine in South America. P. multiflora is used to treat postpartum hemorrhage, P. pinnatifida is used as a sedative, and P. purpurata is used as an anti-inflammatory.

There are about 30 to 35 species in the genus.

Species include:

Perezia atacamensis
Perezia bellidifolia
Perezia calophylla  
Perezia carduncelloides
Perezia carthamoides 
Perezia catharinensis
Perezia ciliaris
Perezia ciliosa 
Perezia delicata 
Perezia dicephala 
Perezia eryngioides 
Perezia fonkii
Perezia fosbergii 
Perezia kingii
Perezia lactucoides 
Perezia linearis 
Perezia lyrata  
Perezia macrocephala
Perezia magellanica
Perezia mandoni 
Perezia megalantha
Perezia multiflora – escorzonera, chanqoroma 
Perezia nutans
Perezia pedicularidifolia 
Perezia pilifera 
Perezia pinnatifida – valeriana 
Perezia poeppigii
Perezia prenanthoides 
Perezia pungens  
Perezia purpurata – marancel   
Perezia pygmaea 
Perezia recurvata
Perezia spathulata  
Perezia squarrosa  
Perezia sublyrata
Perezia virens 
Perezia volcanensis

References

External links
Apodaca, M.J., J.V. Crisci, and L. Katinas. (2015). Andean Origin and Diversification of the Genus Perezia, an Ancient Lineage of Asteraceae. Washington, D.C.: Smithsonian Institution Scholarly Press.
Perezia. Preliminary Checklist of the Compositae of Bolivia. Royal Botanic Gardens, Kew.

Further reading
 Katinas, L. (2012). Revisión del género Perezia (Compositae). Boletín de la Sociedad Argentina de Botánica 47(1-2), 159–261.

Nassauvieae
Asteraceae genera